Lukáš Laksík (born 21 January 1990 in Banská Bystrica) is a Slovak football striker who currently plays for semi-professional ŠK Badín.

References

External links
FK Dukla profile

1990 births
Living people
Slovak footballers
Sportspeople from Banská Bystrica
Association football forwards
FK Dukla Banská Bystrica players
FK Železiarne Podbrezová players
ŠK Kremnička players
Slovak Super Liga players
2. Liga (Slovakia) players
3. Liga (Slovakia) players
4. Liga (Slovakia) players